Nottoway Plantation, also known as Nottoway Plantation House is located near White Castle, Louisiana, United States.

Mansion and grounds

Architecture

John Randolph commissioned renowned architect Henry Howard of New Orleans with the task of designing the grand mansion with the intention that no expense would be spared in the construction. Howard sited the three-story wooden frame house, which includes a one-story rusticated stucco-covered brick base on a concrete foundation, to face east towards the Mississippi River. The entrance facade is asymmetrically balanced, with a projecting bedroom wing to the left side and a large curved bay with galleries on the right. The main five-bay structure, with a central projecting portico, emphasizes height rather than width, with the main living areas on the second and third stories both being  in height above the one-story basement, scored to appear as stone, and featuring an arched niche flanked with narrow fenestrations. The galleries are embellished with custom ornamental iron railings made in New Orleans and capped with molded wooden handrails. Double curved granite staircases, installed by skilled mason, Newton Richards, rise to the second story. These steps were built with the left side intended for ladies and the right for gentlemen. The boot scraper at the bottom can also identify the steps for the men. The separate staircases were so that the men would not see the women's ankles beneath their skirts as they climbed, which was considered a severe breach of social etiquette at the time. The close spacing and angularity of the gallery's 22 square columns and elongated capitals also emphasize the vertical qualities of the house. Above the capitals, small brackets branch out to carry a tall entablature decorated with modillions, supporting a projecting cornice that nearly covers the hipped roof that is pierced with six chimneys. In the rear of the house is a two-story garçonnière wing where the Randolph sons resided.

Construction of Nottoway was completed in 1859 at an estimated cost of $80,000. Randolph destroyed the architect's plans after completion to prevent any duplicate homes from being built.

Interiors
 

Nottoway has over an acre of floor space spread out over three floors and a total of 64 rooms with 165 doors and 200 windows, most of which can double as doors. The house enjoyed 19th-century novelties such as a bathroom on each floor with flushing toilets and hot and cold running water, gas lighting throughout the house, and a complex servant call-bell system. The principal rooms of the house are located on the second floor. The entrance hall runs the length of the house and is 12 feet wide and 40 feet long. Above the doors and along the ceilings are plaster frieze moldings, with modillions interspersed with paterae, made from mud, clay, horse hair, and Spanish moss. To the right of the entrance hall is the most unusual, and John Randolph's favorite room in the house is the White Ballroom. With Corinthian columns, hand-cast archways, and an L-shaped extension into a curved bay, Randolph had it painted entirely white, including the flooring, to show off the natural beauty of his seven daughters, six of whom would be married there. Featuring two fireplaces with hand-carved rococo white marble mantles, there is also an original mirror placed so that the women could see if their ankles or hoops were showing beneath their skirts. Over one of the fireplaces, there is a painting of Mary Henshaw (no relation to the family), whose eyes are said to follow the viewer around the room. Flanking the entrance hall to the left are a gentleman's study, a stair hall, and the formal dining room. The study and the dining room feature black Italian hand-carved marble mantles on their coal-burning fireplaces, and the rooms are filled with period antique furniture. The dining room plasterwork showcases pink camellias, Emily Randolph's favorite flower, and is the only plasterwork in the house to have color.

The main staircase of Honduran mahogany is covered in green velvet and ascends to the Ancestral Hall on the third floor. The hall was used by the Randolphs as a family parlor, being a central thoroughfare to many of the adjacent bedrooms, and gave access to the third-floor gallery with views of the Mississippi River. Nearby is the main bedroom, with one of the three original bathrooms, as well as a small room that was used as a nursery for Julia Marceline, Randolph's last and only child born at Nottoway. During the Civil War, Emily Randolph utilized a bedpost to hide valuable jewelry at the end of the bed. Though originally bedrooms, one has been made into a music room displaying 19th-century musical instruments, and another, known as the Wicker Room, features wicker furniture owned by the Randolph family.

The first-floor basement has been transformed into a restaurant and a small museum about the Randolph family and the history of the plantation. Initially, the space held the laundry, dairy, wine cellar, servants' quarters, and a 10-pin bowling alley for the children's amusement.

Grounds
John Nelson of New Orleans designed the Nottoway landscape to include 120 fruit and citrus trees, 12 magnolia trees, poplar, live oak trees, 75 rose bushes, 150 strawberry plants, and a variety of flower and vegetable gardens. However, due to neglect and the erosion of six and a half acres of land by the Mississippi River, the gardens designed by Nelson no longer exist. Today, the house sits only 200 feet behind a river levee, and the grounds include a small formal hedge garden adjacent to the garçonnière where the detached kitchen once stood, and a fountain courtyard in front of the southern bedroom wing. Surrounding the house are modern ancillary buildings that house offices and event facilities. The owners expanded the property in 2008 by building a carriage house, ballroom, and nine Acadian-style cottages modeled after the property's original slave quarters, while the plantation was closed to the public for repairs, as a result of damage incurred by Hurricane Gustav. To the north of the house is the reconstructed stables, now re-purposed as a ballroom, and the Randolph cemetery where the remains of the family were reinterred in 2003.

History

19th century
John Hampden Randolph was born in Virginia in 1813, a member of the prominent Randolph family. He migrated with his family to Mississippi when his father, Peter Randolph Jr., was appointed a federal judge in Woodville, Mississippi, by President James Monroe in 1820.

John Randolph married Emily Jane Liddell in 1837 and had eleven children. Randolph devoted most of his time to his cotton plantation, but believing sugar production would be more lucrative, he decided to move his family to southern Louisiana in 1842, where he purchased a  cotton plantation that he named Forest Home. Converting the plantation to sugar cane production two years later and constructing Iberville Parish's first steam-powered sugar mill, Randolph was able to triple his earnings over his cotton production.

He selected Henry Howard, a trendy architect of the time, considered one of the finest architects of 19th-century New Orleans. Many of his Greek Revival- and Italianate-style buildings, churches, and homes can still be found in the city. He also designed the neighboring Belle Grove, now destroyed. Randolph and the owner of Belle Grove, John Andrews, are known to have had a rivalry of sorts that even extended to their homes. Compiling the materials for his plantation home, cypress logs were cut and cured under water for six years, then cut into planks and dried into what is called virgin cypress. The wood's most notable feature is its durability and resistance to termites. Handmade bricks were baked in kilns by enslaved workers, and 40 carpenters, brick masons, and plumbers were hired by Howard, who lived in tents at the construction site while doing their work. The massive home was completed in 1859, along with various other buildings, including quarters for enslaved workers, a schoolhouse, greenhouse, stable, steam-powered sugar house, wood cisterns, and other necessary buildings for an agricultural operation.

Soon after the house was completed, the American Civil War began. Randolph did not support secession from the United States. Nevertheless, he backed the Confederacy financially once the war began. He sent his three sons to fight for the Confederate Army, losing his oldest son, Algernon Sidney Randolph, at the Battle of Vicksburg. With the war coming ever closer to Nottoway, Randolph decided to take 200 enslaved people to Texas, and grow cotton there while his wife, Emily, stayed at Nottoway with the youngest children, hoping that their presence would save it from destruction. The plantation was occupied by U.S. Army and Confederate troops. Though the grounds were damaged and the animals were taken, Nottoway survived the war with only a single grapeshot to the far left column that did not fall out until 1971.

With the emancipation of enslaved people, John Randolph contracted with 53 of his former bond people to continue working as laborers. When he returned to Nottoway after the Civil War, most, having few other choices, returned with him. John Randolph died at Nottoway on September 8, 1883, leaving the plantation to his wife.

Emily Randolph sold the plantation in 1889 for $50,000, which she divided equally among her nine surviving children and herself. She died in Baton Rouge in 1904.

20th century
The new owners of Nottoway were Désiré Pierre Landry and his father-in-law, Jean Baptiste Dugas, whose family owned the plantation until 1909 when Landry's widow sold Nottoway to sugar planter Alfonse Hanlon. Soon after, Hanlon lost Nottoway to foreclosure in 1913 due to crop failures the previous two years that resulted in tax problems and accrued medical bills by his wife's failing health. Dr. Whyte G. Owen purchased the plantation out of foreclosure for $10,000.

Dr. Owen, one-time Surgeon General of Louisiana, attempted to run the estate as a sugar plantation but was unsuccessful. He sold off , keeping the house and surrounding property. After he died in 1949, Nottoway was inherited by his son Stanford who lived with his wife Odessa in the house until he died in 1974. After that, Odessa Owen lived alone in the massive house, trying to maintain it with her limited resources. Knowing she was unable to care for the house adequately, Owen sold the plantation to Arlin K. Dease in 1980, who had restored three other antebellum mansions, including the Myrtles Plantation in St. Francisville, Louisiana, with the caveat that she be allowed to live in the house until her death. After she died in 2003, the house ceased to be a private home. Dease restored Nottoway, working a crew of 40 to 60 men for 12 hours a day, and opened the house to the public three months after his purchase. Arlin Dease sold Nottoway to Paul Ramsay of Sydney, Australia, in 1985, after he had stayed at the property while in the area for business.

21st century
Under Ramsay's tenure, Nottoway has become a resort destination. The house was listed on the National Register of Historic Places in 1980 and is a popular tourist attraction in southern Louisiana.

See also
 National Register of Historic Places listings in Iberville Parish, Louisiana
 List of plantations in Louisiana

References

External links

 Official website

Antebellum architecture
Museums in Iberville Parish, Louisiana
Greek Revival houses in Louisiana
Houses on the National Register of Historic Places in Louisiana
Italianate architecture in Louisiana
Houses completed in 1859
Historic house museums in Louisiana
Sugar plantations in Louisiana
Farms on the National Register of Historic Places in Louisiana
Houses in Iberville Parish, Louisiana
Plantation houses in Louisiana
National Register of Historic Places in Iberville Parish, Louisiana
Slave cabins and quarters in the United States
1859 establishments in Louisiana
Gilded Age mansions